Leptostelma is a genus of South American flowering plants in the family Asteraceae.

 Species
 Leptostelma camposportoi (Cabrera) A.M.Teles & Sobral - Rio de Janeiro
 Leptostelma catharinensis (Cabrera) A.M.Teles & Sobral - Santa Catarina
 Leptostelma maximum D.Don - Bolivia
 Leptostelma meyeri (Cabrera) A.M.Teles - Chaco, Entre Rios
 Leptostelma tucumanense (Cabrera) A.M.Teles - Catamarca, Tucuman
 Leptostelma tweediei (Hook. & Arn.) D.J.N.Hind & G.L.Nesom - Brazil, Bolivia, Paraguay, Uruguay, Argentina

References

Asteraceae genera
Astereae